This article is written about the 1960 film; for the 1937 film or the 1944 film, see Parakh (1937 film) or Parakh (1944 film).

Parakh is a 1960 Indian Hindi film, based on a story by famed music director Salil Chowdhury, that displays Bimal Roy's lighter side and is a satirical look at Indian democracy in its early years. Bimal Roy received the Filmfare Best Director Award for the film. The ensemble cast was led by Sadhana and Basanta Choudhury. The film has music by Salil Choudhury, featuring Lata Mangeshkar's hit "O Sajana Barkha Bahaar Aai".

The film became a "semi-hit" at the box office.

Plot
The central character is the Post Master Nivaran who is given a mysterious cheque for 500,000 to be given to anyone who will use it to benefit the people of the village. There is a postman Haradhan who is actually Sir Jagdish Chandra who pretends to be lame and has secretly come to the village to know the right person to hand over the cheque, so he visits most of the possible candidates for verification of their honesty. Then there is the postmaster's wife, who is sick and would rather use the money to cure her illness, and his beautiful daughter Seema, who has a crush on the village schoolmaster Rajat. Meanwhile, all the greedy and influential people of the village are busy trying to convince everybody why they are most deserving of the money; they include the village Pandit, the landlord Rai bahadur tandav, the money lender Bhanjhi Babu, the village doctor, Vaidji and the school master Rajat who withdraws his name, who is by far the most respected. Each one tries to woo the villagers by being sympathetic and become a cheerful giver to all by offering various sops. They all decide democracy is the best means and decide to hold an election where the winner gets the money. One day the landlord's westernised sister in law Chanda arrives to the village, who is given lift by Rajat on his cycle from the railway station, thereafter she tries to get friendly to Rajat with some excuse or the other. Seema gets upset over this scenario and quarrels with him. The movie is a satirical look at democracy through various twists and turns in the plot, interwoven with a simple love story.

Cast
 Sadhana as Seema 
 Durga Khote as J.C. Roy's mother (Rani Ma) 
 Leela Chitnis as Mrs. Nivaran 
 Praveen Paul  
 Mumtaz Begum as Mrs. Tandav
 Mehar Banu  
 Basanta Choudhury as Prof. Rajat Sen Sharma 
 Nazir Hussain as Postmaster Nivaran 
 Kanhaiyalal as Pandit Tarkalankarji 
 Jayant as Rai Bahadur Tandav Landlord
 Rashid Khan as Village Doctor 
 Asit Sen as Bhanju Babu 
 Motilal as Haradhan / Sir Jagdish Chandra Roy
 Hari Shivdasani as School's Principal 
 Moni Chatterjee as Kaviraj (Vaidji) 
 Keshto Mukherjee as Keshto (The Compounder)
 Nishi as Chanda (Tandav's sister in law)

Music
This film has a very popular song "O Sajana, Barkha Bahar Aai..." sung by Lata Mangeshkar, penned by Shailendra and composed by Salil Chowdhary who also happens to be story-writer of the film.

Awards and nominations
Parakh is one of the seven Bimal Roy's film where he won Filmfare Awards for Best Direction. 
Won
 Filmfare Best Director Award - Bimal Roy
 Filmfare Best Supporting Actor Award - Motilal
 Filmfare Best Sound Award - George D'Cruz
Nominated
 Filmfare Award for Best Film
 Filmfare Award for Best Story - Salil Choudhury

References

External links
 

1960 films
1960s Hindi-language films
Films directed by Bimal Roy
Indian satirical films
Indian black-and-white films
Films scored by Salil Chowdhury